Eyad Ismoil (born circa 1971) is a Jordanian citizen who, for his role in the 1993 World Trade Center bombing, was convicted by the United States District Court for the Southern District of New York of conspiracy in 1997.

Early life
Born in Jordan, Ismoil attended high school in Jordan. He entered the United States in 1989 on a student visa to study engineering at Wichita State University, where he enrolled at the Intensive English Language Center to study English as a second language. Ismoil  overstayed his visa and moved to Dallas, Texas. In December 1992, he was contacted by Ramzi Ahmed Yousef, with whom he re-located to New York City on February 22, 1993 to begin preparing for the attack.

World Trade Center bombing
On February 26, 1993, Ismoil, accompanied by Yousef, drove a van packed with explosives into the parking garage below the World Trade Center in Manhattan, New York. The van exploded at 12:17 p.m., killing six people, causing numerous injuries, and inflicting an estimated five hundred million dollars' worth of damage to the WTC. Ismail fled the United States that night, as did Yousef, on a separate flight.

In August 1995, Ismoil was captured by Jordanian authorities in Amman and extradited to the United States to stand trial in New York for his role in the bombing.

According to Ismoil's attorney, Louis Aidala, Ismoil was tricked into cooperating with the others, and had in fact loaded the explosives into the van, thinking they were cleaning supplies. However, prosecutor David Kelly noted the fingerprints of both men which had been found in a Jersey City, New Jersey apartment where the bomb had been manufactured, telephone records, and automatic teller machine surveillance videos linking both Ismoil and Yousef to the purchase of chemicals used to create explosives.

On November 12, 1997, Ismoil, Yousef, and several other co-defendants were found guilty of conspiracy.

On April 3, 1998, Ismoil was sentenced to 240 years in prison, fined $250,000, and ordered to pay $10,000,000 in restitution. Throughout the trial, Ismoil continued to maintain his innocence, saying:
"Jail me and you will add one number to the wrong list. But don't think that you will ever rest because tyrants always end up in trouble."

Notes

External links
Full text of United States v. Salameh, et al. (33.6 MB)

1971 births
Jordanian emigrants to the United States
Jordanian people imprisoned abroad
Living people
Inmates of ADX Florence
Islamic terrorism in New York (state)
Jordanian mass murderers
People imprisoned on charges of terrorism
People extradited from Jordan
People extradited to the United States